Jewish atheism refers to the atheism of people who are ethnically and (at least to some extent) culturally Jewish. Contrary to popular belief, the term "Jewish atheism" is not a contradiction because Jewish identity encompasses not only religious components, but also ethnic and cultural ones. Jewish law's emphasis on descent through the mother means that even religiously conservative Orthodox Jewish authorities would accept an atheist born to a Jewish mother as fully Jewish.  

Jewish secularism, which describes Jews who do not explicitly reject the existence of God but also do not believe it is an important part of their Jewishness, has a long tradition in the United States. A 2013 study conducted by the Pew Research Center found that 62% of self-described American Jews say being Jewish is mainly a matter of ancestry and culture, while just 15% say it is mainly a matter of religion. Even among Jews by religion, 55% say being Jewish is mainly a matter of ancestry and culture, while 66% say it is not necessary to believe in God to be Jewish.

Organized Jewish life
There has been a phenomenon of atheistic and secular Jewish organizations, mostly in the past century, from the Jewish socialist Bund in early twentieth-century Poland to the modern Congress of Secular Jewish Organizations and the Society for Humanistic Judaism in the United States. Many Jewish atheists feel comfortable within any of the three major non-Orthodox Jewish denominations (Reform, Conservative, and Reconstructionist). This presents less of a contradiction than might first seem apparent, given Judaism's emphasis on practice over belief, with even mainstream guides to Judaism suggesting that belief in God is not a necessary prerequisite to Jewish observance. However, Orthodox Judaism regards the acceptance of the "Yoke of Heaven" (the sovereignty of the God of Israel in the world and the divine origin of the Torah) as a fundamental obligation for Jews, and the Reform movement has rejected efforts at affiliation by atheistic temples despite many Reform Jews being atheist/agnostic. Nevertheless, the presence of atheists in many denominations of modern Judaism from Secular Humanistic Judaism to Conservative Judaism has been noted.

Jewish theology
Nineteenth-century and early twentieth-century Reform Judaism in the US, which had become the dominant form of Judaism there by the 1880s, was profoundly shaped by its engagement with high profile skeptics and atheists such as Robert Ingersoll and Felix Adler. These included the writings of rabbis such as Isaac Mayer Wise, Kaufmann Kohler, Emil G. Hirsch, Joseph Krauskopf, Aaron Hahn, and J. Leonard Levy, with the result that a distinctly panentheistic character of US Reform Jewish theology was observable, which many would have viewed as atheistic or espousing atheistic tendencies.

Liberal Jewish theology makes few metaphysical claims, and is thus compatible with atheism on an ontological level. The founder of Reconstructionist Judaism, Mordecai Kaplan, espoused a naturalistic definition of God, while some post-Holocaust theology has also eschewed a personal god. The Jewish philosopher Howard Wettstein has advanced a non-metaphysical approach to religious commitment, according to which metaphysical theism-atheism is not the issue. Harold Schulweis, a Conservative rabbi trained in the Reconstructionist tradition, has argued that Jewish theology should move from a focus on God to an emphasis on "godliness." This "predicate theology", while continuing to use theistic language, again makes few metaphysical claims that non-believers would find objectionable.

Secular Jewish culture

Many Jewish atheists would reject even this level of ritualized and symbolic identification, instead embracing a thoroughgoing secularism and basing their Jewishness entirely in ethnicity and secular Jewish culture. Possibilities for secular Jewishness include an identification with Jewish history and peoplehood, immersion in Jewish literature (including such non-religious Jewish authors as Philip Roth and Amos Oz), the consumption of Jewish food, the use of Jewish humor, and an attachment to Jewish languages such as Yiddish, Hebrew or Ladino. A high percentage of Israeli Jews identify themselves as secular, rejecting some religious practices (see Religion in Israel). While some non-believers of Jewish ancestry do not consider themselves Jews, preferring to define themselves solely as atheists, some would argue that Judaism is arguably a culture and tradition that can be embraced without religious faith, despite Jewish culture revolving around Abrahamic conceptions of God.

Notable people

Historically, many well-known Jews have rejected a belief in deities. Some have denied the existence of a traditional deity while continuing to use religious language. Karl Marx was born into an ethnically Jewish family but raised as a Lutheran, and is among the most notable and influential atheist thinkers of modern history; he developed dialectical and historical materialism which became the basis for his critique of capitalism and his theories of scientific socialism. Marx became a major influence among other prominent Jewish intellectuals including Moses Hess. In one of his most cited comments on religion he stated: "Religion is the sigh of the oppressed creature, the heart of a heartless world, and the soul of soulless conditions. It is the opium of the people."

Some other famous Jews have wholeheartedly embraced atheism, rejecting religiosity altogether. Sigmund Freud penned The Future of an Illusion, in which he both eschewed religious belief and outlined its origins and prospects. At the same time he urged a Jewish colleague to raise his son within the Jewish religion, arguing that "If you do not let your son grow up as a Jew, you will deprive him of those sources of energy which cannot be replaced by anything else." The anarchist Emma Goldman was born to an Orthodox Jewish family and rejected belief in God, while the Israeli prime minister Golda Meir, when asked if she believed in God, answered "I believe in the Jewish people, and the Jewish people believe in God." In the world of entertainment, Woody Allen has made a career out of the tension between his Jewishness and religious doubt ("Not only is there no God, but try getting a plumber on weekends"). David Silverman, president of the American Atheists since 2010, swore after his bar mitzvah that he would never again lie about not being an atheist.

See also

 Apostasy in Judaism
 Who is a Jew?
 Haskalah
 Jewish culture
 Jewish schisms
 Jewish secularism
 Reconstructionist Judaism

Notes

 
Religious atheism
Atheists
Disengagement from religion